Steve or Stephen Owen may refer to:
 Steve Owen (American football) (1898–1964), American football player and longtime coach of the New York Giants
 Steve Owen (racing driver) (born 1974), Australian V8 Supercar racing driver
 Steve Owen (EastEnders), fictional character in EastEnders
 Stephen Owen (sinologist) (born 1946), American sinologist
 Stephen Owen (politician) (born 1948), Canadian politician

See also
 Steve Owens (disambiguation)